Paul Berthon (Paul Emile Berthon, 15 March 1872 in Villefranche-sur-Saône – 15 February 1910 in Paris) was a French artist who produced primarily posters and lithographs. Berthon's work is in the style of Art Nouveau, much like his contemporary Alphonse Mucha. Berthon studied as a painter in Villefranche-sur-Saône before moving to Paris. He later enrolled at the Ecole Normale d'Enseignement de Dessin and received lessons in painting from Luc-Olivier Merson and lessons in decorative arts from Eugène Grasset. Grasset had a far greater influence on him, and he may be regarded as his pupil.  His study of the decorative arts influenced his print making, influencing the strong lines and natural details that guided his art. The vast majority of Berthon's lithographed posters did not include advertisements and were meant to stand on their own.

Further reading
 Les Maîtres de l'Affiche
 Gérald Schurr: Les Petits Maîtres de la peinture 1820–1920 : Les Éditions de l’Amateur, t. IV, : Paris 1979.
 Victor Arwas: Berthon & Grasset : Academy/Denoël: 1978, .

References

External links

 Works

1872 births
1934 deaths
Art Nouveau illustrators
French lithographic artists
French poster artists